Tolors is a village in the Sisian Municipality of the Syunik Province in Armenia.

Demographics 
The Statistical Committee of Armenia reported its population was 450 in 2010, up from 406 at the 2001 census.

Gallery

References 

Populated places in Syunik Province